Bryotropha pallorella is a moth of the family Gelechiidae. It is found in Portugal, Spain, France, Corsica, Sardinia, Italy and Morocco.

The wingspan is 11–13 mm. The forewings are greyish brown to dark greyish brown, weakly mottled with lighter and darker scales. The hindwings are very pale brown at the base, but much darker towards the apex. Adults have been recorded on wing from March to October.

References

Moths described in 1952
pallorella
Moths of Europe
Moths of Africa